The Old Shelby County Courthouse, also known as Columbiana City Hall, is a defunct courthouse in Columbiana, Alabama.  It was built in 1854.  It served as the courthouse for Shelby County until 1906 when a larger court facility was built.  It also served as Columbiana's city hall.  Since 1982, it has housed the Shelby County Museum and Archives and its operator, the Shelby County Historical Society.

It was listed on the National Register of Historic Places on October 29, 1974.  It was subsequently listed on the Alabama Register of Landmarks and Heritage on January 25, 2011.

In 1826, Columbiana, Alabama won an election against Montevallo, Alabama to house the courthouse. The people of Columbiana threw a huge celebration which involved the destruction of a tree sitting in the very spot they planned to move and build the courthouse. To destroy the tree, gunpowder was packed into holes that had been drilled into the tree. Once ignited, the blast was said to have been heard for miles. The wood building which was built following this celebration no longer stands and was replaced with the Old Shelby County Courthouse in 1854.

References

External links

Shelby County Historical Society webpage
Shelby County Museum & Archives webpage

National Register of Historic Places in Shelby County, Alabama
City halls in Alabama
Museums in Shelby County, Alabama
History museums in Alabama
City and town halls on the National Register of Historic Places in Alabama
Properties on the Alabama Register of Landmarks and Heritage